Nyoma is a principal village of southern Ladakh in India, the headquarters of an eponymous subdivision, tehsil, community development block and Indian Air Force Base in the Leh district. It is located on the bank of the Indus river after its 90-degree bend near Dungti east of Nyoma and before the valley narrows to a gorge near Mahe northwest of Nyoma. The Nyoma tehsil and subdivision cover  all of southern Ladakh, including the Rupshu plains south of Nyoma, the Indus valley of Skakjung north of Nyoma, and the Hanle valley. Nyoma gompa, a Buddhist monastery, is located on the hill slope north of the village.

Location and geography 

The Indus river after its entry into Ladakh flows in a southwesterly direction through a wide valley. Afterwards, it takes a 90-degree bend at Dungti blocked by the higher ground of the Chushul valley. The village of Nyoma lies 33 km west of the bend on the right bank (northern bank), where it is also coupled with another neighbouring village Mood (or Mud or Mad). The Indus river here is said to be wide and shallow. It could be easily forded.

Nyoma is located 41 km southeast of Chumathang, and 87 km south of Chushul. Nearby villages are Mahe and Loma. Hanle, the largest village in southern Ladakh, is 80 km to the southeast. Mount Sajum on the border with China is 43 km to the east.

Nyoma tehsil borders the Tibet Autonomous Region of China on the south and the east. The southern border runs along the Chumar village in Rupshu and the Imis Pass at the end of the Hanle valley. The eastern border, a Line of Actual Control resulting from the 1962 war with China, runs along the Kailash Range watershed of the Indus river till the village of Dumchele and narrows to the right bank of the Indus river up to Demchok. 

The road from Leh runs till the village of Koyul, crossing the Indus river at Loma. From Koyul to Demchok, there is only a rough track. An alternative border road runs between the Koyul Lungpa valley and Demchok via the Umling La pass.

Military facilities

Nyoma Airbase

Nyoma is home to an Advanced Landing Ground (ALG) of Indian Air Force that was built in 1962 but remained unutilized. It was reactivated in 2009 when an An-32 landed in this airfield. Now the airbase at Nyoma of the Indian Military is fully operational. 

The airbase received the Wildlife Board's forest clearance in 2022 to expand into 508 hectare of land inside Changthang Wildlife Sanctuary. The Government of India announced in January 2023 that this airstrip will be upgraded in two years by the end of 2024 at a cost of Rs.214 crore (US$27 m) to a 1,235 acre full fighter jet airbase at  elevation with an expanded 2.7 km paved runway with ability to recover airplanes and minor repair facilities. Aeroplanes can land from both directions on this airstrip. Chushul, Fukche & Leh are other nearby airbases & ALG airstrips.

Field Firing Range

Nearby Mahe has Indian Military's "Mahe Field Firing Range" (MFFR) on 1259.25 hectares land inside the Changthang Wildlife Sanctuary. Firing range is 40 to 50 km from the disputed India-China Line of Actual Control. This is the one of its type firing range in the entire Indian-held Ladakh region where all types of weapons can be fired.

Infrastructure development

Roads
Roads infrastructure this area is being enhanced under the India-China Border Roads projects.

Fiber optical cable for internet & telephony

Wildlife clearance was granted in 2022 for laying optical fiber cables in the 
Changthang Wildlife Sanctuary and Karakoram Wildlife Sanctuary for the internet and telephony connectivity.

Tourism 
Since 2010, foreign tourists with Inner Line Permits are permitted to visit Nyoma and its monastery.

Civil administration

Nyoma subdivision 

The permanent civilian habitations under the administration of the Nyoma Community Development Block (district subdivision) include villages like Nayoma, Hanle, Koyul, Demchok, Tsaga, Mudh, Rongo, Nyedar, etc.

Nyoma village

Demographics 

According to the 2011 census of India, Nyoma has 202 households. The effective literacy rate (i.e. the literacy rate of population excluding children aged 6 and below) is 49.94%.

See also
 India-China Border Roads 
 Line of Actual Control
 List of disputed territories of India

Notes

References

Bibliography

External links

Villages in Nyoma tehsil
Indian Air Force bases